Sozo Water Park (1988) is a water park located in Lahore, Punjab, Pakistan, and is one of the few water-themed amusement parks in the city. It is the largest water park in Pakistan.

History

The water park first opened on May 28, 1998 on the Muslim holiday of Eid al-Fitr. The name of the park came from a greek word “Sozo” meaning "Salvation". It is referred to by Dost Pakistan as the "largest and best water park of Pakistan".  Trip Advisor says it is the best water park in Lahore "to beat the scorching heat."

The park claims it can host events for up to 10,000 people and has parking for 1,000 vehicles. The waterpark is located in Lahore, Punjab, Pakistan, and is one of the few water-themed amusement parks in the city of Lahore. The park has a separate section for women.

Water rides
The park has three pools and many waterslides.  There is also a large bucket called "Balti"; which every few minutes pours water down on visitors. The park also includes swings.  Cleanliness of the facility is paramount there.  It is the largest water park in Pakistan.  Attractions include “dozens of water slides” and land-based amusements.

The Bullet Drop water slide was added in 2021.  This slide was a first in the country.  It is an international import done at a cost of Rs150,000,000 “installed in Pakistan for the first time ever. Big Drop slide is the first of its kind ...”

Animal attractions
Sozo Water Park also once had an animal attraction featuring dolphins. During the fall of 2019 four dolphins imported from Ukraine died at the park.

Park safety
In 2004 three children and two teachers were killed when a merry-go-round ride at the park failed. The ride collapsed killing the park-goers who were picnicking at Sozo. Forty-seven other students were also injured in the ride's failure. Authorities learned that the park had had not maintained the merry-go-round since its installation.  The water wheel malfunctioned with catastrophic results.  An official news release from the Citizens' Commission for Human Development termed it "negligence" and recommended more regulation and setting up a bureau. Initially, it was attributed to negligent maintenance.  However, later study showed it had only been there two months, and was attributed to a design defect in the axle and load bearing structures, not a lack of maintenance.

The source of water inlets  which come through “three housing societies, eight squatter settlements and a slum”  have created health issues at the park.  It has been cited as an example of “water mismanagement.”

See also 
 List of parks and gardens in Lahore
 List of parks and gardens in Pakistan

References

External links
 Sozo Park website
 

Water parks in Pakistan
Amusement parks in Lahore
Tourist attractions in Lahore